The Sun Odyssey 49 DS (Deck Salon) is a French cruising sailing yacht that was built by Jeanneau. A recreational keelboat, its hull was designed by Philippe Briand, with styling by Vittorio Garroni.

Production
The 49 DS is part of a family of Sun Odyssey yachts  built by Jeanneau in France. Production began in 2004, but it is now completed.

Design
The Sun Odyssey 49 DS's hull is built predominantly of fiberglass. A masthead sloop with a nearly-plumb stem, it features a reverse transom, a skeg-mounted spade-type rudder controlled by a wheel, and a fixed fin keel, with a weighted bulb. It displaces  and carries  of iron ballast.

The design has sleeping accommodation for six people, with a two double berths in dual bow cabins and an aft cabin with a central double berth. The galley is located on the starboard side at the companionway ladder. The galley is "L"-shaped and is equipped with a two-burner stove and a double sink. A navigation station is opposite the galley, on the starboard side. There are three heads, one just aft of each of the bow cabins and one on the port side in the aft cabin.

See also
List of sailing boat types

References

External links

Keelboats
2000s sailboat type designs
Sailing yachts
Sailboat type designs by Philippe Briand
Sailboat type designs by Vittorio Garroni
Sailboat types built by Jeanneau